Gillian Catherine Gill (née Scobie, born June 12, 1942) is a Welsh-American writer and academic who specializes in biography. She is the author of Agatha Christie: The Woman and Her Mysteries (1990); Mary Baker Eddy (1998); Nightingales: The Extraordinary Upbringing and Curious Life of Miss Florence Nightingale (2004); We Two: Victoria and Albert, Rulers, Partners, Rivals (2009) and Virginia Woolf: And the Women Who Shaped Her World (2019).

Born in Cardiff, Wales, Gill attended Cardiff High School for Girls and graduated from the University of Cambridge with a first-class honours degree in French, Italian, and Latin. In March 1972 she obtained her Ph.D., also from Cambridge, for a thesis entitled André Malraux: A Study of a Novelist. After marrying, she emigrated to the United States and taught at Northeastern University, Wellesley, Harvard, and Yale, where she was a fellow of Jonathan Edwards College and director of the Women's Studies Program.

Gill served as executive director of the Alliance of Independent Scholars, a member of board of directors for National Coalition of Independent Scholars, and is a member of the Modern Language Association of America. She was a National Endowment for the Humanities fellow from 1981 to 1983.

Works
Biographies
Agatha Christie: The Woman and Her Mysteries, Free Press, 1990.
Mary Baker Eddy, Perseus Books, 1998.
Nightingales: The Extraordinary Upbringing and Curious Life of Mods Florence Nightingale, Random House, 2004.
We Two: Victoria and Albert, Rulers, Partners, Rivals, Ballantine Books, 2009.
Virginia Woolf: And the Women Who Shaped Her World, Houghton Mifflin Harcourt, 2019.

Translations
Luce Irigaray, Speculum of the Other Woman, Cornell University Press, 1985.
Luce Irigaray, Marine Lover of Friedrich Nietzsche, Columbia University Press, 1991.
Luce Irigaray, An Ethics of Sexual Difference, Cornell University Press, 1993.
Luce Irigaray, Sexes and Genealogies, Columbia University Press, 1993.
Lucienne Frappier-Mazur, Writing the Orgy: Power and Parody in Sade, University of Pennsylvania Press, 1996.

Notes

External links

Interview with Gillian Gill, Discussing Creativity, 2011 (video).
Gill, Gillian. "Mrs. Eddy’s Voices", New York Review of Books, June 29, 2000.
Gill, Gillian. "Excerpt from We Two", The New York Times, June 19, 2009.
Reviews
Jarvis, Claire. "Beholding Virginia Woolf Through the Women in Her Life", New York Times, December 20, 2019 (review of Gill's Virginia Woolf).
Leddy, Chuck. "The life, love of Britain’s Victorian power couple", Boston Globe, September 5, 2009 (review of Gill's We Two).
Marshall, Megan. "Married With Children", The New York Times, June 19, 2009 (review of Gill's Nightingales).
Moore, Charlotte. "It was a life of constant wrestling", The Daily Telegraph, September 14, 2004 (review of Gill's Nightingales).
Mortimer, John. "Murder Most Tidy", The New York Times, October 14, 1990 (review of Gill's Agatha Christie).

British women writers
American women writers
1942 births
Living people
21st-century American women